Włodzimierz Julian Korab-Karpowicz (born 24 October 1953) is a Polish philosopher and political theorist.

Biography 
W. J. Korab-Karpowicz was born in Gliwice, Poland in 1953. He comes from a noble Polish family. Korab, included in his family name, refers to the Korab coat of arms. In his early youth he lived in Gdańsk and then in Sopot, where he completed high school. He studied Engineering at the Gdańsk University of Technology, where, in 1977, he completed a Master's degree in Electronic Engineering. He then studied Philosophy at the Catholic University of Lublin, where, during the Solidarity revolution of 1980-1981, he became Vice-President of the Independent Students' Union (NZS). Escaping the imposition of martial law in Poland, with a scholarship from the Leadership Development Office of the Presbyterian Church (USA), he continued his studies at the University of British Columbia in Vancouver, B.C., 1983-1984, the Catholic University of America in Washington, D.C., 1984-1987, and at the University of Oxford, 1988-1991. In 1999 he received a Doctorate in Philosophy from the University of Oxford, for a thesis titled "The Presocratic Thinkers in the Thought of Martin Heidegger". In 2014 he received his Habilitation in Philosophy at the Adam Mickiewicz University in Poznań, Poland.

Career 

In 1991 he returned to Poland and was elected Deputy Mayor of Gdańsk, 1991-1992. He founded and directed the Sopot School of Polish in 1990, the Benjamin Franklin Institute of Management in 1991, the European Foundation for the Preservation of Monuments in 1993, and the College of International Affairs in 1995. He served as a diplomat with the rank of First Secretary at the Embassy of the Republic of Poland in Norway from 1998-2000, and acted as an ethics expert for the European Commission from 2005-2006.

Academic career 

Korab-Karpowicz has taught at several universities including Lazarski University in Warsaw, Poland, Bilkent University, Meliksah University in Turkey, Kyung Hee University in South Korea, the Anglo-American University of Prague in the Czech Republic, the Lebanese American University and the Hariri Canadian University in Lebanon, Sun Yat-sen University in China and Texas State University in the United States, and more recently at Zayed University in Dubai. He is currently Lady Davis Visiting Professor at the Hebrew University of Jerusalem.

He is considered “one of Poland's most renowned philosophers and political thinkers”  and has written several books. He is the author of On the History of Political Philosophy: Great Political Thinkers from Thucydides to Locke,  (Routledge 2016) and Tractatus Politico-Philosophicus: New Directions for the Future Development of Humankind, (Routledge 2017). His articles have been published by The Review of Metaphysics, The Monist, Philosophy Today, Ethical Theory and Moral Practice, Modern Age, and many other journals. In his publications he usually uses the name: W. Julian Korab-Karpowicz. Also, being a public intellectual, he often writes for Polish and international newspapers, including Rzeczpospolita, Nasz Dziennik, Tygodnik Solidarność, Do Rzeczy, China Daily, Today's Zaman and Jerusalem Post.

References

External links 
Web page at Texas State University
Marquis Who's Who in the World
Amazon: On the History of Political Philosophy
Confederation of Polish Nobility -- Krakow Branch
Publication information by Scholar
Publications and bio at Academia.edu
An article and a short bio in Rzeczpospolita

1953 births
Living people
Political philosophers
Polish historians of philosophy
Alumni of Trinity College, Oxford
Alumni of the University of Oxford
Gdańsk University of Technology alumni
Catholic University of America alumni
Politicians from Gdańsk
People from Sopot
20th-century Polish nobility
Candidates in the 2015 Polish presidential election
Heidegger scholars
21st-century Polish philosophers